Tikathali is a village and former Village Development Committee that is now part of Mahalaxmi Municipality in Province No. 3 of central Nepal. After the restructuring of local political bodies it has been integrated to form a new municipality named 'Mahalaxmi Municipality'. At the time of the 1991 Nepal census it had a population of 4094 living in 711 individual households.

References

External links
UN map of the municipalities of Lalitpur District

Populated places in Lalitpur District, Nepal